Lidia Teresa Chmielnicka-Żmuda (8 March 1939 – 27 September 2002) was a former female Polish volleyball player, a member of Poland women's national volleyball team in 1963–1968, bronze medalist of Olympic Games Mexico 1968 and silver medalist of European Championship (1963 and 1967), eight-time Polish Champion (1960, 1962, 1963, 1964, 1965, 1966, 1971, 1972).

Career
In Polish national team she played 119 times in 1963-1968. She won a bronze medal of Olympic Games Mexico 1968 and double-silver of European Championship (Romania 1963 and Turkey 1967). Her club career began in Opole and then moved to AZS AWF Wawrszawa. She won with this club 6 titles of Polish Champion and silver medal of Polish Championship in season 1960/1961. Her next club was Start Łódź and she won with this team bronze, silver and two gold medals of Polish Championship.

Sporting achievements

Clubs

National championships
 1959/1960  Polish Championship, with AZS-AWF Warszawa
 1960/1961  Polish Championship, with AZS-AWF Warszawa
 1961/1962  Polish Championship, with AZS-AWF Warszawa
 1962/1963  Polish Championship, with AZS-AWF Warszawa
 1963/1964  Polish Championship, with AZS-AWF Warszawa
 1964/1965  Polish Championship, with AZS-AWF Warszawa
 1965/1966  Polish Championship, with AZS-AWF Warszawa
 1968/1969  Polish Championship, with Start Łódź
 1969/1970  Polish Championship, with Start Łódź
 1970/1971  Polish Championship, with Start Łódź
 1971/1972  Polish Championship, with Start Łódź

National team
 1963  CEV European Championship
 1967  CEV European Championship
 1968  Olympic Games

External links
 
 

1939 births
2002 deaths
Olympic volleyball players of Poland
Volleyball players at the 1968 Summer Olympics
Olympic bronze medalists for Poland
Sportspeople from Lublin
Polish women's volleyball players
Olympic medalists in volleyball
Medalists at the 1968 Summer Olympics